Campiglossa clathrata is a species of fruit fly in the family Tephritidae.

References

Tephritinae
Insects described in 1862
Diptera of North America
Taxa named by Hermann Loew